From (stylized as FROM) is an American science fiction horror television series created by John Griffin. It stars an ensemble cast consisting of Harold Perrineau, Catalina Sandino Moreno, Eion Bailey, David Alpay, Elizabeth Saunders, Shaun Majumder, Scott McCord, Ricky He, Chloe Van Landschoot, Pegah Ghafoori, Corteon Moore, Hannah Cheramy, Simon Webster, Avery Konrad, Paul Zinno, and Elizabeth Moy. The series premiered on Epix on February 20, 2022. It received generally positive reviews from critics for its story and Perrineau's performance. In April 2022, the series was renewed for a second season, which is scheduled to premiere on April 23, 2023.

Premise
In a nightmarish town in middle America that traps everyone who enters, unwilling residents strive to stay alive and search for a way out, but they are plagued by the terrifying nocturnal creatures from the surrounding forest, and secrets hidden in the town itself.

Cast and characters

Main
 Harold Perrineau as Boyd Stevens, the sheriff and de facto mayor of the township
 Catalina Sandino Moreno as Tabitha Matthews, a new arrival who came with her family. She is Jim's wife and Julie and Ethan's mother.
 Eion Bailey as Jim Matthews, a new arrival who came with his family. He is Tabitha's husband and Julie and Ethan's father.
 David Alpay as Jade, a new arrival who arrives at the same time as the Matthews family. A very wealthy software developer, he has a very arrogant, abrasive manner and struggles with his new circumstances.
 Elizabeth Saunders as Donna, the head of Colony House
 Shaun Majumder as Father Khatri, the community priest who lives in the township
 Scott McCord as Victor, a very strange member of Colony House who is the earliest surviving resident
 Ricky He as Kenny Liu, the community's deputy sheriff who lives in the township
 Chloe Van Landschoot as Kristi, the community's doctor who lives in the township
 Pegah Ghafoori as Fatima, a member of Colony House
 Corteon Moore as Ellis Stevens, Boyd's son. He chooses to live at Colony House instead of the township.
 Hannah Cheramy as Julie Matthews, a new arrival who came with her family. She is Tabitha and Jim's daughter and Ethan's sister. She chooses to live at Colony House.
 Simon Webster as Ethan Matthews, a new arrival who came with his family. He is Tabitha and Jim's son and Julie's brother.
 Avery Konrad as Sara, a worker at the diner who lives in the township with her brother Nathan. She suffers from hallucinations which tell her to kill people.
 Paul Zinno as Nathan, Sara's brother who lives in the township, tending to the farm animals
 Elizabeth Moy as Tian-Chen Liu, Kenny's mother who works at the diner and lives in the township

Recurring
 Vox Smith as boy in white, whom only Ethan, Victor, and Sara can see
 Cynthia Jimenez-Hicks as Trudy, a resident of Colony House
 Bob Mann as Frank Pratt, a man whose wife and daughter were killed by monsters the night before the Matthews and Jade arrived
 Simon Sinn as Bing-Qian Liu, Kenny's father and Tian-Chen's husband. He suffers from dementia and lives in the township.

Episodes

Season 1 (2022)

Season 2

Production
On June 7, 2018, YouTube Red announced the development of the John Griffin–created series From as part of an overall deal between production companies Midnight Radio and the Russo brothers' AGBO. By April 2021, the series had transferred to Epix after YouTube Red, now YouTube Premium, moved into unscripted programming. The project was given a series order consisting of 10 episodes, with Jack Bender set to direct the first four. In May 2021, Harold Perrineau, Eion Bailey, and Catalina Sandino Moreno were cast in lead roles. In July, Shaun Majumder, Elizabeth Saunders, Avery Konrad, Hannah Cheramy, Ricky He, Simon Webster, Chloe Van Landschoot, and Pegah Gahfoori were announced to star.

Filming for the first season began in the last week of May 2021 in Halifax, Nova Scotia. Principal photography took place around Beaver Bank and Sackville River, situated in the suburban community of Lower Sackville. The opening theme song, "Que Sera, Sera (Whatever Will Be, Will Be)", was performed by the Pixies, and Chris Tilton composed the musical score.

On April 24, 2022, Epix renewed the series for a second season which is scheduled to premiere on April 23, 2023.

Release
The series premiered in the United States on Epix on February 20, 2022. In Australia, it was distributed by Stan. In the UK, it is broadcast on Sky Sci-Fi In Canada, it is available to stream on Paramount+.

Reception
On the review aggregator website Rotten Tomatoes, 94% of 16 reviews are positive, with an average rating of 6.8/10. The website's critical consensus reads, "Ably anchored by Harold Perrineau, From is an intriguing journey toward a mysterious destination." Metacritic, which uses a weighted average, assigned a score of 65 out of 100 based on four critics, indicating "generally favorable reviews".

Awards and nominations

References

External links
 

2020s American horror television series
2020s American science fiction television series
2022 American television series debuts
American horror fiction television series
English-language television shows
MGM+ original programming
Television series about monsters
Television series by MGM Television
Television shows filmed in Halifax, Nova Scotia